The 1937 Italian Grand Prix was a "750 kg Formula" Grand Prix race held on 12 September 1937 at the Montenero Circuit in Livorno.

Race report
Caracciola took an early lead from pole, Lang was second but he soon took the lead from Caracciola, the two Mercedes drivers pushing each other hard. Team manager Alfred Neubauer was not impressed by the internal fighting. The partisan crowd were disappointed when the Italian Nuvolari retired and gave his car to Farina.

Von Brauchitsch and Kautz were out, the two leading Mercedes had a fierce fight to the flag with Caracciola blocking any attempt to pass by Lang. Rosemeyer couldn't match their pace and Caracciola held on for a win with Lang just 0.4s behind him at the flag.

Classification

References

Italian Grand Prix
Italian Grand Prix
Grand Prix